Sree Guruvayoorappan is a 1972 Indian Malayalam-language film, directed and produced by P. Subramaniam. The film stars Gemini Ganesan, Sharada, Kaviyoor Ponnamma, Thikkurissy Sukumaran Nair and Jose Prakash. The film had musical score by V. Dakshinamoorthy.
The plot includes the origin story of Guruvayoor Temple.
As soon as Dwarka went beneath the sea, Uddhava reached then shore as instructed by Lord Krishna prior to his demise. He with the help of Vayu got hold of the divine idol worshipped by Lord Krishna and his parents for all three Yugas. With help of Parashurama and Brihaspati the idol was installed in divine land created by Parasurama by his axe. Bhargava Kshetra , modern day Kerala. The miracles of Lord Guruvayoorappan forms the crux of plot.

Cast

Gemini Ganesan
Sharada
Kaviyoor Ponnamma
Thikkurissy Sukumaran Nair
Jose Prakash
Kedamangalam Sadanandan
Unnimary
Adoor Pankajam
Aranmula Ponnamma
Baby Kumari
Baby Sumathi
Baby Suneetha
Kanta Rao
K. S. Gopinath
Rajasree
Kottarakkara Sreedharan Nair
Rani Chandra
S. P. Pillai
Somasekharan Nair
T. K. Balachandran
Veeran
Vijayasree

Soundtrack
The music was composed by V. Dakshinamoorthy and the lyrics were written by O. N. V. Kurup, Melpathoor and Poonthanam, or are Traditional.

References

External links
 

1972 films
1970s Malayalam-language films
Films directed by P. Subramaniam